Bosnia and Herzegovina Sportsperson of the Year are annual sporting awards given to best athletes of Bosnia and Herzegovina by Banja Luka-based newspaper Nezavisne novine.

List of winners

Notes

References

External links
List of winners

National sportsperson-of-the-year trophies and awards
Sport in Bosnia and Herzegovina